Randy Becker is an American stage, television and film actor.

Becker is best known for such productions as Love! Valour! Compassion!, "Lie Down with Dogs" movie in 1995, Sabrina and Jack & Jill.

In 1995 Becker had an epileptic seizure off-stage while performing in Love! Valour! Compassion! Becker's understudy finished the performance.

References

External links

American male stage actors
American male television actors
American male film actors
People with epilepsy
Living people
20th-century American male actors
Year of birth missing (living people)
Place of birth missing (living people)